Mount Moanda is a sandstone rock lying south to Moanda, a manganese mining town in Gabon. The mountain is less than 500m high but remains a landmark to the city. It lies next to Mount Boundinga, also a sandstone rock. The road connecting Moanda to Bakoumba passes between the two rocks.

The rock is respected by Moanda residents and almost holy to residents of the Third Zone district of the city. Several stories and legends about the rock exist.

See also
 Mount Boundinga
 Moanda

Mountains of Gabon